The Dormition Cathedral of Khabarovsk (Grado-Khabarovsky Uspensky sobor)   is a Russian Orthodox cathedral. It is one of the largest churches in the Russian Far East, and was built in 2000–02 to a design by Yuri Podlesny, a local architect.

The five-domed church stands about 60 meters tall. Its design harks back to Konstantin Thon's design for the Annunciation Church in Saint Petersburg. 

The church contains a 19th-century copy of the Abazino icon of the Theotokos from a previous church on the site. That church was built in the 1890s and contained the marble tomb of Baron Andrei von Korff. It was demolished by the Communists in 1930.

See also 
 Khabarovsk Metropolitan Cathedral

References

Christianity in Siberia
Khabarovsk
Russian Orthodox cathedrals in Russia
Buildings and structures in Khabarovsk Krai
Tourist attractions in Khabarovsk Krai